The tsort program is a command line utility on Unix and Unix-like platforms, that performs a topological sort on its input. , it is part of the POSIX.1 standard.

History
According to its info page, this command was initially written for providing an ordering of object files that allowed the linker to process them sequentially (each one exactly once, and in order). The FreeBSD manual page dates its appearance to Version 7 Unix.

Note that the following description is describing the behaviour of the FreeBSD implementation of tsort and mentions GNU features where they may exist. Other implementations or versions may differ.

Syntax
 tsort [-dlq] [FILE]

FreeBSD options can be:
 -d         turn on debugging
 -l         search for and display the longest cycle.
 -q         Do not display informational messages about cycles.

GNU provides the following options only:
 --help     display help message and exit
 --version  display version information and exit

There are no options prescribed by POSIX.

Behavior
tsort reads its input (from the given FILE, or standard input if no input file is given or for a FILE of '-') as pairs of strings, separated by blanks, indicating a partial ordering. The output is a total ordering that corresponds to the given partial ordering.

In other words: for a directed acyclic graph (used as a dependency graph), tsort produces a listing of the
vertices so that for all edges 'a->b', 'a' comes before 'b' in the listing.

Examples
tsort lists the vertices of a directed acyclic graph in such an order that all ordering/direction relations are respected:

Call graph 
The result is that  should be defined first,  second, etc.):

Library 
The traditional ld (Unix linker) requires that its library inputs be sorted in topological order, since it processes files in a single pass. This applies both to static libraries and dynamic libraries, and in the case of static libraries preferably for the individual object files contained within.

BSD UNIX uses tsort as a common part of the typical ar & ranlib command invocations (from /usr/share/mk/bsd.lib.mk):
lib${LIB}.a: ${OBJS} ${STATICOBJS}
    @${ECHO} building static ${LIB} library
    @${AR} cq ${.TARGET} `lorder ${OBJS} ${STATICOBJS} | tsort -q` ${ARADD}
    ${RANLIB} ${.TARGET}

Here  ("library order") is used to generate the inter-file dependency list by inspecting the symbol table.

Usage notes
Notice the interchangeability of white space separators so the following inputs are equivalent:

Pairs of identical items indicate presence of a vertex, but not ordering (so the following represents one vertex without edges):

 a a

Strictly speaking there is no topological ordering of a graph that contains one or more cycles. However tsort prints a warning and GNU tsort prints the detected cycles to standard error (lines beginning with 'tsort:'):
$ tsort <<EOF
> a b
> b c
> c a
> EOF
UX: tsort: INFORM: cycle in data
tsort: a
tsort: b
tsort: c
a
b
c

See also

 Sort (Unix)
 Make (software)
 Topological sorting
 List of Unix commands
 Call graph

References

Further reading

External links
manual page of tsort on
 FreeBSD,
 OpenBSD,
 NetBSD,
 AIX,
 Solaris,
 HP-UX
 dep-trace Orders basic dependencies and unfolds nested ones. (basic: without 2D graphical presumption)

Unix SUS2008 utilities
Inferno (operating system) commands